James Robison may refer to:
 James Robison (author) (born 1946), American writer
 James Robison (televangelist) (born 1943), American televangelist
 James W. Robison (1831–1909), American politician, farmer, and rancher
 Jim Robison (born 1942), American bridge player
 Jim Robison (footballer) (1927–2015), Australian rules footballer

See also
James Robinson (disambiguation)